Koi Kisise Kum Nahin is a 1997 Hindi action film directed by Raj N. Sippy and produced by Romu N. Sippy. The film starred Shalini Kapoor, Ravi Kishan, Rohit Roy, Ashish Vidyarthi in the lead roles.

Plot
The is the story of two honest police officer. They are trying to arrest Rana and Vicky, drug mafias of the city.

Cast
 Milind Gunaji as Ajay
 Shalini Kapoor as Mansi
 Ravi Kishan as Ravi Kishan
 Mamik Singh as Avinaash
 Rohit Roy as Anand
 Kashmera Shah as Rekha
 Ashok Saraf
 Ashish Vidyarthi as Ashok

Music
The film music was composed by Anand Raj Anand.

"Aao Bata Hoon" - Vinod Rathod, Anand Raj Anand
"Gham KO Dilse" - Kavita Krishnamurthy, Vinod Rathod, Anand Raj Anand, Preeti Sagar
"Humko Hone De Sharabi" - Abhijeet, Kumar Sanu
"Jaane Kyun Na Tu" - Abhijeet, Kavita Krishnamurthy
"Hum Tum MIlke" - Udit Narayan, Kavita Krishnamurthy
"Sanwali Haseena" - Kumar Sanu, Kavita Krishnamurthy

References

External links
 

1990s Hindi-language films
1997 films
Films scored by Anand Raj Anand
Films directed by Raj N. Sippy
Indian action films